The Isle of Man is mostly hilly, but has only one summit, Snaefell, classified as a mountain (over 2,000 feet).

Overview 
The south of the island has a small coastal plain around Castletown and Ballasalla but is otherwise hilly. In the south west these hills rise to more prominent peaks, notably South Barrule (483 m), and Cronk ny Arrey Laa (437 m) which drops almost vertically into the sea.

A central valley separates the southern hills from the central range which contains the highest peaks. This central range contains 11 out of 12 of the Island's highest peaks. It has open moorland and rough terrain. It is very sparsely populated and has just one major road crossing it except along the coast.

This then drops quite suddenly to a large flat northern glacial till plain which has only small rolling hills (max. 96 m) known as the Bride hills.

Marilyns 
The Isle of Man contains five Marilyns:

List of peaks over 1,500 feet (457 m) 
The Isle of Man contains 11 peaks which stand at over 1,500 ft. All of these, except for the South Barrule (in the south) are found in the central range which spans the region between the central valley and the flat fertile northern plain. Although none of these peaks are especially high, they appear quite prominent and impressive due to their proximity to the sea. Whilst many of these peaks are rugged, they are not steep enough to provide many opportunities for technical climbing (which can be found in abundance around the coast). There are opportunities for scrambling in some areas, including the northern slopes of the North Barrule, around the Sloc, and the southern slopes of Greeba Mountain. These can provide a training ground for the higher steeper mountains in places such as Snowdonia and the Highlands of Scotland; they are also far less crowded than some of Britain's more popular hill destinations. All of these peaks can be reached by a rough hill walk.

Additional heights above 1500 feet include Mullagh Ouyr (gr 398861) and two unnamed points on the ridge between Clagh Ouyr and the North Barrule (gr 425900 & 432904).

References 

Mountains and hills of the Isle of Man
Landforms of the Isle of Man
Geography of the Isle of Man